The Never Gone Tour is the sixth headlining concert tour by American boy band, the Backstreet Boys. The tour was launched in support of their fifth studio album, Never Gone (2005). It is the last BSB tour with all five members of the group, as Kevin Richardson left the band shortly after the tour concluded in June the following year, until his return in 2012 (for the In a World Like This Tour 2013).

The tour grossed an estimated $49.5 million within 79 tour dates.

Opening acts
The Click Five 
Jonas Brothers 
Kaci Brown 
Seminole County 
Jesse McCartney 
Kate Alexa 
Sonji

Setlist
The following setlist was obtained from the concert held on August 26, 2005, at the Dodge Theatre in Phoenix, Arizona. It does not represent all concerts for the duration of the tour. 
"Video Sequence"

Act 1
"The Call"
"My Beautiful Woman"
"More than That"
"Climbing the Walls"
"Shape of My Heart"

"Video Sequence" 

Act 2
"The One"
"I Still..."
"I Want It That Way"
"Show Me the Meaning of Being Lonely"
"Larger than Life"
"Siberia"

"Video Sequence" 

Act 3
"All I Have to Give"
"As Long As You Love Me"
"I'll Never Break Your Heart"
"Just Want You to Know"
"Crawling Back to You"
"Quit Playing Games (with My Heart)"

"Video Sequence" 

Act 4
"Weird World"
"Drowning"
"Incomplete"

Encore
"Everybody (Backstreet's Back)"

Tour dates

Box office score data

References

Backstreet Boys concert tours
2005 concert tours
2006 concert tours